Arlit Airport  is an airport serving Arlit in Niger.

References

Airports in Niger